"My Boyfriend's Back" is a hit song in 1963 for the Angels, an American girl group. It was written by the songwriting team of Bob Feldman, Jerry Goldstein and Richard Gottehrer (a.k.a. FGG Productions who later formed the group the Strangeloves). The track was originally intended as a demo for the Shirelles, but ended up being released as recorded. The single spent three weeks at No. 1 on the Billboard Hot 100 chart, and reached No. 2 on the R&B Billboard.

Description 
The song is a word of warning to a would-be suitor who, after being rebuffed by the female narrator of the song, spread nasty rumors accusing her of romantic indiscretions. Now, the narrator declares, her boyfriend is back in town and ready to settle the score, and she warns the rejected admirer to watch himself.

Other musicians on the record include Herbie Lovelle on drums, Billy Butler, Bobby Comstock, and Al Gorgoni on guitar, and Bob Bushnell overdubbing on an electric and an upright bass. This song also features a young Ronnie Dio on the trumpet. Feldman, Goldstein & Gottehrer also wrote and produced some of Dio's early work with the band Ronnie Dio & The Prophets.

The song begins with a spoken recitation from the lead singer that goes: "He went away, and you hung around, and bothered me every night. And when I wouldn't go out with you, you said things that weren't very nice".

The album version, which has appeared on a few compilations in stereo, features the line: "Hey. I can see him comin'/ Now you better start a runnin'", before the instrumental repeat of the bridge section, a repeat of one stanza from the refrain ("My boyfriend's back/He's gonna save my reputation"), and finally, the coda section, just before the song fades.

The inspiration for the song came from co-writer Bob Feldman, who overheard a conversation between a high school girl and the boy she was rebuffing.

Cash Box described it as "a handclappin’ mashed-potatoes-styled delighter...that can bust wide open in no time flat" and praised the arrangement by Leroy Glover.

Billboard named the song No. 24 on their list of 100 Greatest Girl Group Songs of All Time.

Notable cover versions
"My Boyfriend's Back" has been the subject of several notable cover versions.

Rival girl groups the Chiffons and Martha and the Vandellas recorded covers shortly after the Angels' original release. In 1983, Melissa Manchester released a faithful cover version as a single that reached No. 33 on the Adult Contemporary chart. The song was also covered by former American Idol contestant Paris Bennett on her 2007 album Princess P. Another lesser known take was recorded by Me First and the Gimmie Gimmies on their 2001 album Blow in the Wind.

Later in 1963, Bobby Comstock and the Counts issued an answer record titled "Your Boyfriend's Back" which peaked at No. 98 in the U.S.

Bette Bright and the Illuminations released a cover in 1978 as their debut single.

Sarah Brightman released a version of the song on a single in 1981.

American child singer Nikka Costa released a cover in 1983 on her album Fairy Tales.

A cover by Australian band Chantoozies featured in the film "The Crossing" (1990), with another Australian band Spazzys covering it on their 2004 album Aloha! Go Bananas.

The song is featured in the 2006 Tony Award-winning musical Jersey Boys. It was also featured on the U.S. television show American Dreams, where it was sung by Christian Pop singer Stacie Orrico, backed by series stars Brittany Snow and Vanessa Lengies.

Parodies, features and references
The song figured prominently in the 1989 made for television film My Boyfriend's Back, which featured Jill Eikenberry, Sandy Duncan and Judith Light as former members of a fictitious girl group the Bouffants.

The song is featured in the 1988 film Clean and Sober during a dance sequence.

The Angels version was used in the promotional trailers for the 1993 movie My Boyfriend's Back, but was not featured in the film itself. 

It is briefly referred to in the Dire Straits song "Romeo and Juliet".

The title of Aerosmith's record "Permanent Vacation" was taken from a lyric in the song.

Humorist Dave Barry is fond of this song, and often references it in his books and columns. In one essay, he says that if he were the President of the United States, "My Boyfriend's Back" would replace "Hail to the Chief" as his arrival song.

A parody of the song lyrics was sung by characters of The Office in Season 8 – Episode 21 "Angry Andy".

Episode 30 of the podcast Cum Town starts with co-host Stavros Halkias singing a parody version called "My Boyfriend's Black".

Charts

References

1963 songs
1963 singles
Songs written by Richard Gottehrer
Songs written by Jerry Goldstein (producer)
The Angels (American group) songs
Sarah Brightman songs
The Raveonettes songs
Santo & Johnny songs
Billboard Hot 100 number-one singles
Cashbox number-one singles
Number-one singles in New Zealand
Smash Records singles
Songs written by Bob Feldman